The Montreal Convention (formally, the Convention for the Unification of Certain Rules for International Carriage by Air) is a multilateral treaty adopted by a diplomatic meeting of ICAO member states in 1999. It amended important provisions of the Warsaw Convention's regime concerning compensation for the victims of air disasters. The Convention attempts to re-establish uniformity and predictability of rules relating to the international carriage of passengers, baggage and cargo. Whilst maintaining the core provisions which have served the international air transport community for several decades (i.e., the Warsaw regime), the treaty achieves modernization in a number of key areas. It protects passengers by introducing a two-tier liability system that eliminates the previous requirement of proving willful neglect by the air carrier to obtain more than US$75,000 in damages, which should eliminate or reduce protracted litigation.

Damages 

Under the Montreal Convention, air carriers are strictly liable for proven damages up to 128,821.00 special drawing rights (SDR), a mix of currency values established by the International Monetary Fund (IMF) equal to roughly US$175,000. Where damages of more than 128,821.00 SDR are sought, the airline may avoid liability by proving that the accident which caused the injury or death was not due to their negligence or was attributable solely to the negligence of a third party. This defense is not available where damages of less than 128,821.00 SDR are sought. The Convention also amended the jurisdictional provisions of Warsaw and now allows the victim or their families to sue foreign carriers where they maintain their principal residence, and requires all air carriers to carry liability insurance.

The main goal of the Montreal Convention was to increase available damages in relation to death or injury of passengers from the limited and outdated limits under the Warsaw/Hague Convention.

No compensation purely for psychiatric injury 

The Convention does not recognize compensation for psychiatric injury or damage unless linked to physical injury. Article 17 of the Convention refers to "bodily injury" in setting out the liability of the carrier for accidents.  Purely psychiatric injury is not eligible for compensation which has been criticised by people injured in plane accidents, legal experts and their families.

Australia 
Australia amended its law to adopt concepts in the Montreal Convention including:

 the removal of references to ‘personal injury’ and replaced with ‘bodily injury’ under the CACL Act to ensure consistency with the 1999 Montreal Convention concerning international flights;
 the preclusion of potential claimants from claiming compensation for mental injuries where that person has not suffered additional personal or property damage

Independent Australian senator Nick Xenophon will introduce a private member's bill into the Australian Parliament in May 2015 which will seek to protect the rights of plane crash survivors to be compensated for psychological trauma.

Leading Australian current affairs TV show 4 Corners on the government owned broadcaster ABC, broadcast a program focusing on the unfairness and injustice of excluding psychiatric injury on March 23, 2015 featuring Karen Casey, a nurse injured when the medical evacuation flight she was nursing on crashed in the waters off Norfolk Island.

Lost baggage 

The Montreal Convention changes and generally increases the maximum liability of airlines for lost baggage to a fixed amount 1,288 SDR per passenger (the amount in the Warsaw Convention is based on weight of the baggage). It requires airlines to fully compensate travelers the cost of replacement items purchased until the baggage is delivered, to a maximum of 1,288 SDR. At 21 days any delayed baggage is considered lost, until the airline finds and delivers it.

Disabled passengers and mobility equipment 

The limitation of compensation for damage to baggage to 1,288 SDRs means that the value of damaged mobility equipment may often significantly exceed available compensation under the Montreal Convention, while the effect of the loss, even temporarily, of mobility equipment places disabled passengers at a substantially increased disadvantage in comparison to other passengers suffering damaged baggage. While for non-disabled people the major issue is the loss of hold baggage, for disabled people the problem tends to be physical damage to wheelchairs and other durable medical equipment due to inappropriate stowage in the hold. Even a basic individually-fitted wheelchair may cost twice the available compensation, with a three-month lead time for replacement. There have been further problems with airlines being reluctant to recognise that cheap mass-market wheelchairs may be unsuitable as even a temporary replacement due to the common need for customised seating solutions among long-term wheelchair users.

The EU in "Communication on the scope of the liability of air carriers and airports in the event of destroyed, damaged or lost mobility equipment of passengers with reduced mobility when traveling by air" notes this disadvantage in relation to EC 1107/2006 "rights of disabled persons and persons with reduced mobility when traveling by air".

The EU report notes that the United States under the Air Carrier Access Act and Canada under Part VII of the Air Transport Regulations have taken action to force airlines to fully cover the costs of damage to mobility equipment as a condition of allowing an airline to operate in their airspace, and notes that the EU may have to take similar steps if the additional duties imposed on airlines by EC 1107/2006 do not resolve the issue.

Ratifications 
As September 2018, there are 133 parties to the Convention. Included in this total is 132 of the 191 ICAO Member States plus the European Union. The states that have ratified represent 131 UN member states plus the Cook Islands. Other states that have ratified include Argentina, Australia, Brazil, Canada, China, all member states of the European Union, India, Indonesia, Israel, Japan, South Korea, Malaysia, Mexico, New Zealand, Nepal, Norway, Pakistan, Russia, Saudi Arabia, Singapore, South Africa, Switzerland, Turkey, Ukraine, the United Arab Emirates, and the United States.

See also
Aviation law
CMR convention
Kenneth Beaumont
 Warsaw Convention

References

External links
Text of the Convention 
Signatures and ratifications

International Civil Aviation Organization treaties
Treaties concluded in 1999
Treaties entered into force in 2003
1999 in Canada
Treaties of Albania
Treaties of Argentina
Treaties of Armenia
Treaties of Australia
Treaties of Austria
Treaties of Azerbaijan
Treaties of Bahrain
Treaties of Barbados
Treaties of Belgium
Treaties of Belize
Treaties of Benin
Treaties of Bolivia
Treaties of Bosnia and Herzegovina
Treaties of Botswana
Treaties of Brazil
Treaties of Bulgaria
Treaties of Burkina Faso
Treaties of Cameroon
Treaties of Canada
Treaties of Cape Verde
Treaties of Chad
Treaties of Chile
Treaties of the People's Republic of China
Treaties of Colombia
Treaties of the Republic of the Congo
Treaties of the Cook Islands
Treaties of Costa Rica
Treaties of Croatia
Treaties of Cuba
Treaties of Cyprus
Treaties of the Czech Republic
Treaties of the Democratic Republic of the Congo
Treaties of Denmark
Treaties of the Dominican Republic
Treaties of Ecuador
Treaties of Egypt
Treaties of El Salvador
Treaties of Equatorial Guinea
Treaties of Estonia
Treaties of Ethiopia
Treaties of Fiji
Treaties of Finland
Treaties of France
Treaties of Gabon
Treaties of the Gambia
Treaties of Georgia (country)
Treaties of Germany
Treaties of Ghana
Treaties of Greece
Treaties of Guatemala
Treaties of Guyana
Treaties of Honduras
Treaties of Hungary
Treaties of Iceland
Treaties of India
Treaties of Indonesia
Treaties of Ireland
Treaties of Israel
Treaties of Italy
Treaties of Ivory Coast
Treaties of Jamaica
Treaties of Japan
Treaties of Jordan
Treaties of Kazakhstan
Treaties of Kenya
Treaties of Kuwait
Treaties of Latvia
Treaties of Lebanon
Treaties of Lithuania
Treaties of Luxembourg
Treaties of Madagascar
Treaties of Malaysia
Treaties of the Maldives
Treaties of Mali
Treaties of Malta
Treaties of Mauritius
Treaties of Mexico
Treaties of Monaco
Treaties of Mongolia
Treaties of Montenegro
Treaties of Morocco
Treaties of Mozambique
Treaties of Namibia
Treaties of the Netherlands
Treaties of New Zealand
Treaties of Niger
Treaties of Nigeria
Treaties of Norway
Treaties of Oman
Treaties of Pakistan
Treaties of Panama
Treaties of Paraguay
Treaties of Peru
Treaties of the Philippines
Treaties of Poland
Treaties of Portugal
Treaties of Russia
Treaties of Qatar
Treaties of South Korea
Treaties of Moldova
Treaties of Romania
Treaties of Rwanda
Treaties of Saint Vincent and the Grenadines
Treaties of Saudi Arabia
Treaties of Senegal
Treaties of Serbia
Treaties of Seychelles
Treaties of Sierra Leone
Treaties of Singapore
Treaties of Slovakia
Treaties of Slovenia
Treaties of South Africa
Treaties of Spain
Treaties of Sudan
Treaties of Sweden
Treaties of Eswatini
Treaties of Switzerland
Treaties of Syria
Treaties of Thailand
Treaties of North Macedonia
Treaties of Tonga
Treaties of Tunisia
Treaties of Turkey
Treaties of Ukraine
Treaties of the United Arab Emirates
Treaties of the United Kingdom
Treaties of Tanzania
Treaties of the United States
Treaties of Uganda
Treaties of Uruguay
Treaties of Vanuatu
Treaties entered into by the European Union
1999 in aviation
Treaties extended to Tokelau
Treaties extended to Greenland
Liability treaties
Treaties extended to Hong Kong
Treaties extended to Macau